The 2012 Campeonato Brasileiro Série A (known as the Brasileirão Petrobras 2012 for sponsorship reasons) was the 56th edition of the Campeonato Brasileiro Série A, the top-level of professional football in Brazil. Corinthians come in as the defending champions having won the title in the 2011 season.
On 11 November 2012, Fluminense won the title for the fourth time.

Format
For the tenth consecutive season, the tournament will be played in a double round-robin system. The team with most points at the end of the season will be declared champion. The bottom four teams will be relegated and will play in the Campeonato Brasileiro Série B in the 2013 season.

International qualification
The Série A will serve as a qualifier to CONMEBOL's 2013 Copa Libertadores. The top-two teams in the standings will qualify to the Second Stage of the competition, while the third and fourth places in the standings will qualify to the First Stage.

Teams

Stadiums and locations

Personnel and kits

Managerial changes

League table

Results

Top goalscorers

Source: globoesporte.com

References

External links

Official webpage 
Official regulations 
2012 Campeonato Brasileiro Série A at Soccerway

 

Campeonato Brasileiro Série A seasons
1